Oxon may refer to:

 An abbreviation for the English city of Oxford, or the English county of Oxfordshire, or the University of Oxford (from Oxonia, Latin for Oxford)
 The post-nominal suffix indicating a degree from the University of Oxford (Latin name Universitas Oxoniensis)
 An area of the English town of Shrewsbury
 Oxon (chemical), an organic compound

See also

 Oxen, plural of ox
 Oxon Creek
 Oxon Hill High School
 Oxon Hill, Maryland
 Oxon Hoath
 Oxus